Mutoh Europe nv is a business unit of Mutoh Holdings Co. Ltd.

Business Summary
Established August 1990
Located in Ostend, Belgium
Core business: digital desktop and Wide-format printer (sign, UV, digital transfer, textile), sign cutting Plotters and CAD
Sales, marketing, distribution, logistics, after-sales support and service
Europe, Middle-East and Africa

Mutoh Europe Company Background
	1987 : Mutoh Deutschland GmbH, Düsseldorf, Germany
	1992 : Local Manufacturing pencil Plotters and scribers at Mutoh Belgium
	1994 : Introduction cutting plotters
	1997 : Introduction of Falcon RJ-800 CAD printers
	1999 : Introduction of Albatros PJ-1304 solvent printers
	2001 : Factory extension phase 2
	2002 : Introduction of eco-solvent printers
	2004 : Factory extension phase 3
	2005 : Introduction mild solvent printers
	2006 : i² - Intelligent Interweaving technology
	2008 : Zephyr UV printer
	2008 : Acquisition of Sesoma & Sericomex Group
	2009 : Introduction Kona cutting plotters
	2010 : Expansion textile / sublimation portfolio
	2011 : Introduction of a new series of garment pattern marking / cutting plotters, called Kona Apparel
   2011 : Mutoh Europe announces the layoff of 124 employees; 45 employees will remain. 
   2012 : Extended ValueJet line for Sign & Display, Indoor & Digital Transfer and Direct Textile applications
	2013 : Introduction ValueCut cutting plotters
   2013 : Introduction ValueJet 1617H (Mutoh's first Sign & Display printer equipped with white inks)
   2014 : Introduction ValueJet 1638X & ValueJet 1638WX with DropMaster technology
   2014 : Introduction ValueJet LED UV printers (ValueJet 426UF & ValueJet 1626UH)
   2015 : Mutoh & Grafityp obtain Indoor Air Comfort certificate (First pan-European low emission certificate for digitally printed self-adhesive film)
   2018 : Introduction PerformanceJet flatbed LED UV printer
   2019 : Introduction XpertJet printers
   2020 : Introduction VerteLith RIP software
   2022 : Introduction XpertJet Pro printers

External links
Mutoh Europe nv website
Mutoh Japan website

Computer printer companies
Electronics companies of Japan
Engineering companies of Japan
Japanese brands